The Definitive Collection is a compilation album by raï singer Rachid Taha. It was released by Wrasse Records in 2007. The album's initial release was limited to 2000 copies, which were accompanied by a DVD that documented Taha's return to Algeria. The album was released in the U.S. in 2008 under the title Rock el Casbah: The Best of Rachid Taha.

Video clips have been made for "Barbès" (1991), "Ya Rayah" (1997),  "Ida" (1998), "Hey Anta" (2000), & "Voilà, Voilà" (2012).

Track listing
"Ya Rayah"
"Rock El Casbah"
"Nokta"
"Voilà, Voilà"
"Habina"
"Kelma"
"Bent Sahra"
"Douce France"
"Indie"
"Jungle Fiction"
"Ida"
"Hey Anta"
"Barbès"
"Barra Barra"
"Menfi"

Release history

References

External links
Official website

Albums produced by Steve Hillage
Rachid Taha albums
2007 compilation albums